Helmetia is an extinct genus of arthropod from the middle Cambrian. Its fossils have been found in the Burgess Shale of Canada and the Jince Formation of the Czech Republic.

Fossils are both rare and poorly known; the genus was described by Walcott in 1918 and has not been reexamined, though it was briefly reviewed in the 1990s and has been included in a number of cladistic analyses. It has been lumped with the arachnomorphs. One analysis has resolved the Helmetiiida as a robust clade and the closest relatives of trilobites.

The most complete specimen of Helmetia is 19 cm long, and has six thoracic segments. There is a head shield and a large tail shield, making the animal leaf-shaped. Unlike trilobites, the margin of the head shield is concave, ending in a spine on each corner. There is an oval structure with two spots at the anterior center of the head shield, behind which are two eyes. The whole animal is broad and flat with a thin exoskeleton. The central region shows paired muscle scars and filamentous structures interpreted as limbs. Because the head shield, thoracic segments, and tail shield are all angular in outline and end in spines, Helmetia is unstreamlined and would likely be a slow swimmer. However, the flattened body and filamentous limbs suggest a floating or swimming lifestyle. It has been interpreted as a nektonic suspension feeder.

References

Further reading

External links 
 
Helmetia in the Paleobiology Database

Prehistoric chelicerates
Cambrian arthropods
Prehistoric animals of Europe
Burgess Shale fossils
Fossil taxa described in 1918
Cambrian genus extinctions
Artiopoda